Dwight Wilbur may refer to:

 Curtis D. Wilbur (1867–1954), American lawyer and judge
 Dwight Locke Wilbur (1903–1997), medical doctor and president of the American Medical Association